Pastorek is a Slovenian novel written by Jurij Hudolin. It was first published in 2008.

See also
List of Slovenian novels

Slovenian novels
2008 novels